Šinkovec (Slovene pronunciation: [ˈʃìːŋkɔʋəts]) is a Slovenian surname that may refer to the following notable people:
Jure Šinkovec (born 1985), Slovenian ski jumper 
Matjaž Šinkovec (born 1951), Slovenian diplomat, politician, translator and journalist 

Slovenian-language surnames